This is a list of notable people who were born in or have been residents of Yonkers, a city in Westchester County, in the U.S. state of New York, in the United States.

Academia
 Herbert Benson (1935-2022), physician
 Daniel Carleton Gajdusek (1923–2008), physician and medical researcher; co-recipient of 1976 Nobel Prize in Physiology or Medicine
 Richard Joel, president of Yeshiva University
 John Howard Northrop (1891–1987), co-recipient of 1946 Nobel Prize in Chemistry
 Rudolph Schoenheimer (19898–1941),  German-American biochemist
 Charles Proteus Steinmetz, German-American mathematician and electrical engineer
Edwin Howard Armstrong (1890–1954), electronics pioneer

Business
 Elisha Otis, inventor of the safety elevator and Otis Elevator Company
 Alexander Smith, founder of Alexander Smith & Sons Carpet Company
 Jay S. Walker founder of Priceline.com

Entertainment
 Amanda Ayala, singer and musician
 Carlos Alazraqui (born 1962), actor, stand-up comedian and impressionist
 Joseph Alfidi (1949–2015), classical pianist
 Charlie Benante (born 1962), musician best known as the drummer for thrash metal band Anthrax, as well as crossover thrashband Stormtroopers of Death.
 Mary J. Blige (born 1971), R&B singer and Academy Award-nominated actress
 Sid Caesar, actor and comedian
 Cathy DeBuono, actress, psychotherapist, radio personality
 DMX (1970–2021), rapper, actor
 Ella Fitzgerald, singer
 Thomas Mikal Ford, actor
 Frances Foster, actress
 Michael Fox (1921–1996), character actor who played Saul Feinberg on the daytime soap opera The Bold and the Beautiful
 Joe Howard, actor
 Immolation, Death metal band
 Jadakiss, rapper, member of The LOX
 Ekrem Jevrić, Montenegrin singer, rapper
 Gene Krupa (1909–1973), drummer
 Clayton LeBouef (born 1954), actor
 Stagga Lee (born 1977), musician
 W.C. Handy, composer and musician
 Sheek Louch (born 1976), rapper, member of The LOX
 Linda Lovelace (1949–2002), star of 1972 "porno chic" film Deep Throat
 Richard Masur (born 1948), actor
 Lawrence Monoson (born 1964), actor
 Cathy Moriarty (born 1960), actress who appeared in Raging Bull
 Outasight, singer, rapper
 Erik Palladino, actor
 Kevin Puts, Pulitzer Prize-winning composer
 Will Rahmer, musician
 Adam Rodriguez, actor
 Robert Shayne, actor
 Avery Storm, R&B singer
 Styles P, Rapper, member of The LOX
 Chip Taylor, songwriter (brother of Jon Voight)
 Paul Teutul, Sr., founder of Orange County Choppers and reality television personality on American Chopper
 Steven Tyler, musician, member of Aerosmith
 Jon Voight, Oscar-winning actor
 Tom Wolk, Hall & Oates session musician

Military
 Joseph Stilwell, U.S. Army General during World War I and World War II

Miscellaneous
 David Berkowitz (born 1953), serial killer known as the Son of Sam
 Leo Baekeland (1863-1944), chemist, invented Bakelite at his "Snug Rock" home and laboratory in Yonkers in 1907
 Felix Alderisio (1912–1971), mobster, bagman, hitman and burglar (Chicago Outfit)
 Michael Burns (born 1947), actor, historian and horse breeder, reared in Yonkers from 1949 to 1956
 James Comey, director of the FBI
 Rudolf Eickemeyer, Jr., photographer
 Ron Garan, astronaut
 Lewis Hine, photographer
 Ethel D. Jacobs, thoroughbred racehorse owner
 Henrietta Wells Livermore (1864–1933), women's suffragist leader
 Michaela Odone (c. 1930–1992, née Murphy), mother of Lorenzo Odone, for whom Lorenzo's oil is named.
 Sally Regenhard, community activist
 Joe Ruback, license plate guy
 Barbara Segal, artist and stone carver 
 Betty Shabazz, widow of civil rights leader Malcolm X
Joel Steinberg (born 1941), attorney convicted of manslaughter
 Adriaen Cornelissen van der Donck, (c. 1618, 1655)
Samuel Untermyer, Prominent lawyer and civic leader known for bequeathing his Yonkers, New York estate, now known as Untermyer Park and Gardens, to the people of Yonkers

Politics
 Antony Blinken, 71st United States Secretary of State
 William F. Bleakley (1883–1969), attorney, judge and politician who was the first Westchester County Executive.
 Alfred DelBello, Mayor of Yonkers
 Mike Spano, Mayor of Yonkers
 Samuel J. Tilden, former Governor of New York and winner of the popular vote in the disputed Presidential Election of 1876
 Nick Wasicsko, mayor during low-income housing controversy, 1988–1989; John F. Kennedy Profile in Courage Award runner-up
 Malcolm Wilson, former Governor of New York

Sport
 Joe Avezzano, American football player and coach
 Rich Bisaccia, NFL coach
 James Blake (born 1979), tennis player
 Billy Burch (1900–1950), professional hockey player who was the first American-born player to win the Hart Trophy
 Dave Costa, NFL player, Saunders HS 1957–1959
 Jon Dalzell (born 1960), American-Israeli basketball player
 Doug DeWitt, professional boxer
 Tommy Dreamer, professional wrestler
 Ralph Goldstein (1913–1997), Olympic épée fencer
 Nealon Greene, professional football player (CFL)
 Sean Kilpatrick, professional basketball player
 Eddie Kingston, professional wrestler
 Allan Kwartler (1917–1998), sabre and foil fencer, Pan American Games and Maccabiah Games champion
 Joe Lapchick (1900–1970), basketball coach.
 Ryan Meara (born 1990), professional soccer player
 Larry Mann (1930–1952), NASCAR driver
 Joe Panik, professional baseball player
 Floyd Patterson, champion heavyweight boxer
 Eulace Peacock, track and field athlete who defeated Jesse Owens in sprints
 Vincent Richards, professional tennis player
 Steve Ridzik, professional baseball player
 Brian Sweeney, professional baseball player
 Salvatore Tripoli, Olympic boxer
 Trill Williams, cornerback for the Miami Dolphins
 George Wright, baseball pioneer

Writer/ journalist
 Mike Breen (born 1961), sports broadcaster
 Mary Calvi, news anchor
 Robert Celestino, writer and director
 Tiziano Thomas Dossena, writer, editor
 Tawny Godin, Miss America 1976, TV journalist (Tawny Little)
 Patrick Quinlan, author, activist
 Patricia Vaccarino, writer
 Elsie B. Washington, author

References

Yonkers, New York